The remora,  sometimes called suckerfish, is any of a family (Echeneidae) of ray-finned fish in the order Carangiformes. Their distinctive first dorsal fins take the form of a modified oval, sucker-like organ with slat-like structures that open and close to create suction and take a firm hold against the skin of larger marine animals. The disk is made up of stout, flexible membranes that can be raised and lowered to generate suction. By sliding backward, the remora can increase the suction, or it can release itself by swimming forward. Remoras sometimes attach to small boats, and have been observed attaching to divers as well. They swim well on their own, with a sinuous, or curved, motion.

Characteristics 
Remora front dorsal fins have evolved to enable them to adhere by suction to smooth surfaces, and they spend most of their lives clinging to a host animal such as a whale, turtle, shark or ray. It is probably a mutualistic arrangement as the remora can move around on the host, removing ectoparasites and loose flakes of skin, while benefiting from the protection provided by the host and the constant flow of water across its gills.  Although it was initially believed that remoras fed off particulate matter from the host's meals, this has been shown to be false; in reality, their diets are composed primarily of host feces.

Habitat 

Remoras are tropical open-ocean dwellers, but are occasionally found in temperate or coastal waters if they have attached to large fish that have wandered into these areas. In the mid-Atlantic Ocean, spawning usually takes place in June and July; in the Mediterranean Sea, it occurs in August and September. The remora's lower jaw projects beyond the upper, and the animal lacks a swim bladder.

Some remoras associate with specific host species. They are commonly found attached to sharks, manta rays, whales, turtles, and dugongs, hence the common names "sharksucker" and "whalesucker".  Smaller remoras also fasten onto fish such as tuna and swordfish, and some of the smallest remoras travel in the mouths or gills of large manta rays, ocean sunfish, swordfish and sailfish.

The relationship between a remora and its host is most often taken to be one of commensalism, specifically phoresy.

Physiology 
Research into the physiology of the remora has been of significant benefit to the understanding of ventilation costs in fish.

Remoras, like many other fishes, have  two different modes of ventilation. Ram ventilation is the process in which at higher speeds, the remora uses the force of the water moving past it to create movement of fluid in the gills. Alternatively, at lower speeds the remora will use a form of active ventilation, in which the fish actively moves fluid through its gills. In order to use active ventilation, a fish must actively use energy to move the fluid; however, determining this energy cost is normally complicated due to the movement of the fish when using either method.  As a result, the remora has proved invaluable in finding this cost difference (since they will stick to a shark or tube, and hence remain stationary despite the movement or lack thereof of water). Experimental data from studies on remora found that the associated cost for active ventilation created a 3.7–5.1% increased energy consumption in order to maintain the same quantity of fluid flow the fish obtained by using ram ventilation.

Other research into the remora's physiology came about as a result of studies across multiple taxa, or using the remora as an out-group for certain evolutionary studies. Concerning the latter case, remoras were used as an outgroup when investigating tetrodotoxin resistance in remoras, pufferfish, and related species, finding remoras (specifically Echeneis naucrates) had a resistance of 6.1–5.5 M.

Use for fishing 
Some cultures use remoras to catch turtles. A cord or rope is fastened to the remora's tail, and when a turtle is sighted, the fish is released from the boat; it usually heads directly for the turtle and fastens itself to the turtle's shell, and then both remora and turtle are hauled in. Smaller turtles can be pulled completely into the boat by this method, while larger ones are hauled within harpooning range. This practice has been reported throughout the Indian Ocean, especially from eastern Africa near Zanzibar and Mozambique, and from northern Australia near Cape York and Torres Strait.

Similar reports come from Japan and from the Americas. Some of the first records of the "fishing fish" in the Western literature come from the accounts of the second voyage of Christopher Columbus. However, Leo Wiener considers the Columbus accounts to be apocryphal: what was taken for accounts of the Americas may have been, in fact, notes Columbus derived from accounts of the East Indies, his desired destination.

Mythology 

In ancient times, the remora was believed to stop a ship from sailing. In Latin, remora means "delay", while the genus name Echeneis comes from Greek ἔχειν, echein ("to hold") and ναῦς, naus ("a ship"). In a notable account by Pliny the Elder, the remora is blamed for the defeat of Mark Antony at the Battle of Actium and, indirectly, for the death of Caligula. A modern version of the story is given by Jorge Luis Borges in Book of Imaginary Beings (1957).

Gallery

Timeline

See also
 List of fish families

References

External links 

 
Scavengers
Carangiformes
Taxa named by Constantine Samuel Rafinesque